Blue Spur may refer to the following in New Zealand:

Blue Spur, Otago, a locality near Lawrence
Blue Spur, West Coast a locality near Hokitika